A Pallas nagy lexikona (Pallas's Great Encyclopedia) was the first Hungarian encyclopedia which was not a translation from other languages.
It was published by the Pallas Literary and Press Corporation between 1893 and 1897. The encyclopedia comprised 16 volumes, 150 000 articles, and it was the work of 300 authors.

History
A Pallas nagy lexikona (literally Pallas's large encyclopedia) is a great universal encyclopedia in Hungarian.

It gradually developed in the years 1893 to 1897 in Budapest. In 1900 it was issued as two parts, but the Encyclopedia eventually reached a total of 18 volumes containing more than 150,000 entries. Chief editor was József Bokor. The authors were renowned Hungarian scientists, most of whom were members of the Hungarian Academy of Sciences. 
In 1911 the company published under the title Révai Nagy Lexikona. In the 20th century in Hungary it achieved great popularity. The latest edition was published in 1935 in 21 volumes. In 1998 Arcanum Adatbázis Kft encyclopedia was completely digitized and sold on CD-carriers.

Order of volumes

References

External links

Pallas's Great Encyclopedia – Online edition

1893 non-fiction books
Hungarian encyclopedias
19th-century encyclopedias